Seven Deaths in the Cat's Eye is a 1973 Gothic horror film directed by Antonio Margheriti.

Plot

Set in Scotland, the film opens with a man being murdered by an unknown killer with a razor. The killer drags the man's body into a dimly lit dungeon and is followed by a ginger cat. The camera focuses on the ginger cat's face as the scene switches. The next scene begins with a carriage driving up to Dragonstone Castle, a Gothic-style castle in the highlands of Scotland, where the passenger in the carriage, Corringa , used to spend her summers with her mother. The camera cuts to a gorilla watching the carriage from an upper window approaching the castle.

After she arrives at the castle, Corringa reunites with her mother, Lady Alicia, and her aunt and penniless owner of the castle, Lady Mary MacGrieff. Throughout the evening, she meets the residents of the castle: Dr. Franz, the residing Priest, the French teacher Suzanna, and her mad cousin, the son and heir of Lady Mary, Lord James MacGrieff. After the dinner party, Lady Alicia is suffocated with a pillow as she sleeps by the killer while the ginger cat watches. Meanwhile, Corringa is disturbed by finding her cousin standing outside her window. Afterward, she hears the cat meowing, which leads her to find a secret passageway hidden behind a portrait in her room. The passageway takes her to the dungeon, where she finds the body of the man murdered in the first frame. Frightened, Corringa faints and is found by the servants who try to tell her mother of the incident and instead find her dead. During the funeral, the ginger cat jumps on the casket, which is supposedly a sign that the deceased is a vampire, according to the legend of the MacGrieffs. This legend states that any MacGrieff killed by another MacGrieff will come back to life as a vampire.

After the funeral, Corringa goes to her cousin James' room seeking answers. There she is frightened to discover the gorilla, James, in a cage among other animals that are dead. She leaves after telling him of the man's body in the cellar and him telling her to go to the police. The next death is that of Mr. Angus, who is murdered outside the tomb of Lady Alicia by a gloved figure who slits his throat with a razor while the cat watches. That same night, Corringa dreams that her mother is a vampire, and the cat disturbs her sleep. Mr. Angus is found by Dr. Franz the following morning.

The next night, the gloved hand unlocks the gorilla's cage. Concurrently, Corringa visits her mother's tomb to search for confirmation that her mother is still there. She finds the coffin splintered, and her mother's tomb is open. She runs away, frightened, and James catches her and takes her back to the house. That night, James and Corringa sleep together. They are interrupted by Lady Mary looking for Dr. Franz. When she does not find him there, she goes to his bedroom, where she sees him kissing Suzanna. Convinced he'll be thrown out of the house, Dr. Franz goes to James' room to tell him the truth about his little sister's death. Once inside, his throat is slashed with a razor by a gloved hand with the cat watching in the manner of the other men.

In the morning, a detective comes to collect the death certificates of the two known deaths, and Corringa reveals to him that her mother's body is not in the coffin. When they go to the tomb, her body is missing, but Dr. Franz's body is there. Corringa finds James' cufflink on the ground beside it. When she confronts James about it, he says he moved the body but didn't kill him. James, the gorilla, was also killed. The detective believes James is responsible for the deaths, causing him to hide beneath the castle's passages. While there, he hears moaning that leads him to the dying priest who has blood on his forehead.

The next victim is Suzanna, who is killed the same way as the men. Corringa finds Lady Mary leaning over Suzanna's body and believes her to be the killer. After she runs through the secret passageway from her room to the cellar, she finds her mother's body. Once she finds her mother, the priest comes down the stairs and reveals himself to be a MacGrieff, masquerading as the priest to kill the remaining MacGrieffs so that he can inherit the estate. He goes to kill Corringa, but James, the detective, and the police come just in time to shoot him before he can kill Corringa.

Cast 

 Jane Birkin as Corringa
 Hiram Keller as Lord James MacGrieff
 Françoise Christophe as Lady Mary MacGrieff
 Venantino Venantini as Padre Robertson
 Doris Kunstmann as Suzanne
 Anton Diffring as Dr. Franz
 Dana Ghia as Lady Alicia
 Serge Gainsbourg as a Police Inspector 
 Konrad Georg as Campbell
 Alan Collins as Angus
 Bianca Doria as Janet Campbell

Historical context
In the 1970s Italy went through a major economic crisis and a reordering of the class system. The aristocracy were disadvantaged because of the economic crisis. In the film, this is reflected through Lady MacGrieff's financial troubles that cause her to consider the castle that has been in the family for many years. Because the film also has roots in France, it is appropriate to look at the impact that the condition of France in the 1970s had on the film. France in the 1970s was in the midst of "student turmoil", where many young students fought for the new age and liberation from traditional ideas. This is reflected in the film by the bisexual French teacher Suzanne, who attempts to find sexual liberation and recognition for other bisexuals.

Production
The film's credits state its story is based on a novella by Peter Bryan. It is unclear whether this was a pseudonym for an author of Italian giallo magazines, or the British novelist Peter Bryan who wrote scripts for Hammer such as The Hound of the Baskervilles and Brides of Dracula. Film historian Roberto Curti origin story being an adaptation of a novel, finding no proof of the book ever existing. Curti notes the original script does not credit Bryan's story and only credits to Margheriti and Simonelli.

Seven Deaths in the Cat's Eye was filmed between February and March 1972. Among the cast was Jane Birkin, at the time still mainly known for the popular song "Je t'aime... moi non plus" which she had recorded with her lover Serge Gainsbourg. Margheriti also cast Gainsbourg in a bit part, and later stated that Gainsbourg had asked, while visiting Birkin on set, to play a cameo in the film. The film's score by Riz Ortolani uses cues from previous Margheriti films such as The Virgin of Nuremberg, Castle of Blood and Seven Deaths.

Release
Seven Deaths in the Cat's Eye was released in Italy, where it was distributed by Jumbo, as La morte negli occhi del gatto on 12 April 1973. The film grossed 219,556,000 Italian lire domestically. The film was later released in West Germany on 7 December 1973, under the title Sieben Tote in den Augen der Katze.

References

Footnotes

Sources

External links

1973 films
1970s crime films
Giallo films
Films directed by Antonio Margheriti
Films set in castles
French horror films
West German films
Films scored by Riz Ortolani
Films set in Scotland
1970s Italian films